This is a list of Spanish television related events from 1958.

Events
 1 January - There are 30.000 television sets in Spain.
 10 January - Debut of live-show Teatro Apolo, directed by Fernando García de la Vega.
 13 March - Matías Prats Cañete first appears on TV broadcasting a football match between Spain and France national teams.
 27 April - Debut of Adventures series Diego Valor, starred by Fernando Delgado.
 May - Concha Velasco first appears on TV, being cast in the life-play The Petrified Forest.
 12 October - Television first broadcasts in the city of Zaragoza.

Debuts
{{Columns-list|colwidth=36em|
 Bromas
 Diego Valor.
 Érase una vez Escenas de la vida vulgar Familias de extraños Fila cero.
 Oliverio Twist, with María Fernanda D'Ocón.
 Tu vida pudo ser otra
 A vuelta de correo.
 Aeropuerto Telefunken
 Café cantante.
 Caras nuevas.
 Cita en el estudio.
 Club del sábado
 El enigma
 La Goleta Gran Salón.
 Hacia la fama Juegue con nosotros.
 Juicio Sumarísimo.
 Minuto musical.
 Música a medianoche.
 Nace una canción.
 Preguntas al espacio.
 ¡Qué felices somos!.
 Reto a la vista.
 Sierra, mar...o nada.
 Teatro Apolo.
 El tranvía del humor}}

Television showsTelediario (1957- )

Ending this year
 Cita con la música (1957-1958)
 Cocina (1957-1958)
 Cotilleo al aire libre (1957-1958)
 Entre nosotras (1957-1958)
 Festival Marconi (1957-1958)
 Teatro de la TVE (1957-1958)
 Teatro de la TVE (1957-1958)
 El Tranvía del humor (1957-1958)

 Foreign series debuts in Spain 
 Investigador Submarino (Sea Hunt) Rin Tin Tin (The Adventures of Rin Tin Tin)Te quiero Lucy (I Love Lucy'')

Births
 3 January - Carles Francino, journalist.
 22 January - Jesús Álvarez, sport journalist.
 12 February - Javier Gurruchaga, showman.
 17 February - Josep Puigbó, journalist.
 26 February - María Casal, actress.
 16 April - Javier Sardà, host.
 6 May - Lolita Flores, actress and hostess.
 16 June - Jordi Hurtado, host.
 12 July - Michael Robinson, host.
 21 July - Máximo Pradera, host.
 18 August - Olga Viza, hostess.
 24 September - Elena Ochoa Foster, hostess.
 28 September - Inés Ballester, hostess.
 31 August - Ramón Ibarra, actor.
 17 October - Melchor Miralles, journalist.
 28 October - Concha García Campoy, journalist.
 2 November - Juan Ramón Lucas, host.
 10 December - Pío Cabanillas Alonso, director General of RTVE.
 16 December - Rody Aragón, host.
 24 December - Janfri Topera, actor.
 28 December - César Sarachu, actor.

See also
1958 in Spain
List of Spanish films of 1958

References